Kushal Malla (born 5 March 2004) is a Nepalese cricketer. He is a left-handed batsman, and a left-arm off spinner.

In September 2019, he was named in Nepal's squad for the 2019–20 Singapore Tri-Nation Series and the 2019–20 Oman Pentangular Series. He made his T20I debut for Nepal, against Zimbabwe, in the Singapore Tri-Nation Series on 27 September 2019.

In January 2020, he was named in Nepal's One Day International (ODI) squad for the 2020 Nepal Tri-Nation Series. He made his ODI debut for Nepal, against the United States, on 8 February 2020. In the match he scored 50 runs from 51 balls, and at the age of 15 years and 340 days, he became the youngest male cricketer to score an international half-century.

In September 2020, he was one of eighteen cricketers to be awarded with a central contract by the Cricket Association of Nepal. In April 2021, in the final of the 2020–21 Nepal Tri-Nation Series, he made an scored 50 not out, becoming the youngest cricketer to score a half-century in a T20I match.

References

External links
 

2004 births
Living people
Nepalese cricketers
Nepal One Day International cricketers
Nepal Twenty20 International cricketers
Place of birth missing (living people)